Erik Schlopy (born August 21, 1972) is former World Cup alpine ski racer from the United States and specialized in the technical events of giant slalom and slalom.

Born in Buffalo, New York and raised in nearby Hamburg, Schlopy competed in three Olympics: 1994, 2002, and 2006. In 1994 at Lillehammer, he placed 34th in giant slalom. At the 2002 Olympics in Salt Lake City, he was thirteenth in the slalom, and was thirteenth in the giant slalom in 2006. He competed in three World Championships, and won a bronze medal in the giant slalom in 2003.

Schlopy made his World Cup debut at age twenty in December 1992, scoring points in 24th place in a super-G at Val-d'Isère, France. His two career World Cup podiums came during his best season in 2001; he finished third in the giant slalom season standings and fifteenth overall. He won seven U.S. national championship titles and was a member of the U.S. Ski Team for fourteen seasons.

Schlopy was a youngster when he started skiing at Kissing Bridge Ski Area near Buffalo, and when his family moved to Stowe, Vermont, he became a force in junior racing with the Mount Mansfield Ski Club. He attended Burke Mountain Academy and was Eastern junior champ at 14, J1 slalom and GS champ at 16, and joined the U.S. Ski Team at 18. Schlopy left the World Cup after the 1995 season to race pro, then decided to return to the World Cup and paid for his training and racing in Winter 1999, and was named to the 2000 Ski Team.

Schlopy retired from competition in 2008. He subsequently became a coach, and in August 2013 it was announced that he had joined the US national ski team as assistant coach to the men's alpine technical team, serving under Bernd Brunner.

World Cup results

Season standings

Race podiums
0 wins
2 podiums (2 GS); 18 top tens

World Championship results

Olympic results

Personal life
Schlopy is married to former Olympic swimmer Summer Sanders; they have two children. They are both Buffalo Bills fans. Freestyle skier Alex Schlopy is Erik's cousin and is the son of Erik's cousin Todd Schlopy, a former NFL placekicker for the Buffalo Bills in 1987.

References

External links

 
 
 

1972 births
Living people
American male alpine skiers
Alpine skiers at the 1994 Winter Olympics
Alpine skiers at the 2002 Winter Olympics
Alpine skiers at the 2006 Winter Olympics
Olympic alpine skiers of the United States
Sportspeople from Buffalo, New York
People from Hamburg, New York
American alpine skiing coaches
Vermont Catamounts skiers